Tetanops cazieri is a species of ulidiid or picture-winged fly in the genus Tetanops of the family Ulidiidae.

References

cazieri